Genie Backup Manager, developed by Genie-soft Inc, is a backup software for Microsoft Windows operating systems that can back up and restore the whole system (operating system, applications, documents, e-mails, settings, files/folders, etc.) to many local and remote devices including internal and external hard disks, Iomega REV Disks, FTP locations, online, across network, and removable media.

The software has two interfaces, a "normal" interface and a "simple" interface, which has a more appealing appearance but fewer advanced options. The software permits backups in standard .zip files or a proprietary format, the latter of which includes an encryption option. An optional supplementary piece of software permits backups of open files.

Criticism
The same backup platform is run under different names by the same owner, Muayyad (Mo) Fahed Shehadeh. For example, Zoolz, BigMIND and PolarBackup are the most popular. This company has a history of offering cheap "lifetime" backups only to renege on them later. Instead of offering to transfer to another platform, even one that sells the same backup service, they send emails that apologize and then encourage the customer to now purchase another premium plan that will be billed monthly. They will only provide a complete refund if you purchased a "lifetime" backup plan within the last 30 days. It is understood that many will feel forced to do this because they already have all their information backed up with Genie. For years, some have been trying to warn others about this company and their practices. Many consider this a bait and switch.  Others describe this as "fraud" and a "scam."

See also
List of backup software

References

Reviews
 PC World Magazine, June 21, 2006
 PC Magazine March 14, 2008

External links
 Background information: 
 

Backup software for Windows